Georgios Xydas (born 14 April 1997) is a Greek professional footballer who plays as a forward for Super League 2 club Anagennisi Karditsa.

Club career 
Xydas completed a transfer to PAS Giannina on 3 July 2018 by signing a three-year contract.

Honours
PAS Giannina
 Super League Greece 2: 2019–20

References

1997 births
Living people
Association football forwards
Greek footballers
Super League Greece players
Football League (Greece) players
Super League Greece 2 players
Olympiacos F.C. players
PAS Giannina F.C. players
AEL Kalloni F.C. players
AO Chania F.C. players
Olympiacos Volos F.C. players
Anagennisi Karditsa F.C. players
Greece youth international footballers
Sportspeople from Chios